Chelmer Village is a housing, retail and industrial development in the east of Chelmsford, Essex. The development was started by Countryside Residential PLC in 1978, using a holistic approach to create a self-contained community on previously greenfield land, of the manors of Springfield Barnes and Cuton Hall. It comprises a variety of modern suburban dwellings, the Chelmer Village Retail Park and Dukes Park Industrial Estate. Together with "Beaulieu Park" and parts of old Springfield the development forms the "Chelmer Village & Beaulieu Park" ward of the Springfield Parish and Chelmsford City Council.

History 
Neolithic and Bronze Age settlements have been found in and around Chelmer Village. Early Saxon pottery has been found by Cuton Way, Chelmer Village Way. There is evidence of an early structure at Springfield Lyon's that dates back to 3,000 BC, with a field monument called a Causewayed Enclosure. Where later, a Bronze Age settlement within the circular ditch was created. The Springfield Lyon's site was later used by the Romans, and by the Anglo-Saxons as a cemetery. A monument depicting a Palaeolithic Flint axe named the Arrow Head Monument has been erected in Chancellor Park to celebrate the early history.

The estate was built upon the farmland of the historic Springfield Barnes manor and opened in 1978, and included the former Barnes Farm, Prentices Farm, Horns Farm and Willshers. The River Chelmer flows along the southern and eastern edges of the suburb, the river also forms part of the Chelmer and Blackwater Navigation, while the development is bordered in the west and north by the A138. A number of historic features remain nearby the river. These include Barnes Mill Lock, Barnes Mill (now a privately owned home) and the Barnes Farm milking parlour, now a bar and restaurant (the Miller and Carter). Barnes Farm infant and junior schools also derive their names from the farmland they were built on.

Chelmer Village is also home to the Chelmer Village Scout Group, based at Barnes Farm School, who offer social events involving the local community.

Other information
Chelmer Village is essentially divided into two parts, the main part of Chelmer Village (in the west) and Chancellor Park (in the east) which was built in 1998, they are divided by Chelmer Village Way, a main road.

Chelmer Village Retail Park is also situated here.

Sport
Wilvale Rangers was formed in 1991 and have over 20 years of connection with Chelmer Village. The club provides football for Junior and Youth football up to 17 years old and as of 2012 began fielding a full men's team in the Chelmsford Sunday League, however the men's team play in Melbourne, Chelmsford. Wilvale Rangers  have a good history of winning various youth competitions in the Chelmsford area. The teams play at various venues but historically their home ground is at Chancellor Park pitches, at the bottom of Chancellor Park development.

The local football club is Chelmer Village Athletic who play in the Chelmsford Sunday League Division 2. Chelmer Village Athletic play at Chancellor Park. Chairman Barrie Deer resurrected the Chelmsford Invitation League alongside Gavin Smith of Gallow United in 2000. However Chelmer Village Athletic folded in 2012.

Chelmer Village also field a veterans' football team named Chelmer Vets who also play at Chancellor Park.

Chancellor Park is home to two separate tennis courts, many football pitches, bowling greens and a sports pavilion all with floodlights called Chancellor Park Sports Area.

Village Square
The Village Square is seen as the centre of Chelmer Village and it is home to Asda, Martellas Fish and Chip takeaway and restaurant, Chelmer Village Hall, The Chelmer Inn pub, Chelmer Village Opticians, Chelmer Village Youth Club, Chelmer Village Dental Surgery, Barnardos charity shop, 'K on trend' Hair Salon, Appletree Pharmacy, Coral Bookmakers and Subway.

Education
There is an infants and primary school in Chelmer Village; Barnes Farm Infants & Juniors. Chancellor Park Primary School is also nearby in Chancellor Park.

There are also two pre-school groups, being 'You and Me' pre-school near the Church, and Rainbow pre-school in the Village hall.

References

External links 
Springfield Parish Council
 Flickr Chelmer Village pictures
 Countryside Properties PLC history
 Barnes Farm pub profile (Pub explorer)
 Barnes Farm schools
 Chelmer Village Scout Group
 Chelmer Village Opticians
 Chelmer Village Scout Group from the Scouts Org

Chelmsford